Etomba is a settlement in Ohangwena Region, Namibia. It is the largest village in the area. Its full name is Etomba laNghifesho, which differentiates it from two other villages known as Etomba.

The village school is Etomba Combined School, it offers grades 1 to 10. This village consists of 150 households, with average number of people living in each household around 6 people. The village has clean drinking water through a rural water supply pipeline providing water at communal taps, some households have water taps and access to underground water for their animals.

References

Populated places in the Ohangwena Region